Theranautilus, is an Indian private, deep-tech, nanotechnology and healthcare company, headquartered in Bangalore, India. The company was established in 2020. The company was initially a lab spin-off from the Indian Institute of Science, Bangalore. Theranautilus’s device can be used to guide the nanorobots to their targets deep inside the dentinal tubules. Once the nanorobots reach the bacterial infestation site, they can be remotely activated to deploy their antibacterial mechanism. This novel solution minimizes root canal failure, which currently afflicts up to 14-16% of the millions of root canal treatment procedures performed every year globally.
They were awarded the National award under Technology Start-up category by the Government of India.

References

Nanotechnology companies